Marquies LaRoy Gunn (born November 22, 1983) is a former American Football defensive end. He was signed by the New York Giants as an undrafted free agent in 2007. He played college football at Auburn.

Gunn was also a member of the Tampa Bay Buccaneers and New Orleans Saints.  He has also played in the Canadian Football League for the Hamilton Tiger-Cats. Now he plays in the Arena Football League for the Arizona Rattlers.

External links
Auburn Tigers bio
Tampa Bay Buccaneers bio

1983 births
Living people
People from Alexander City, Alabama
Players of American football from Alabama
American football defensive ends
Canadian football defensive linemen
American players of Canadian football
Auburn Tigers football players
New York Giants players
Tampa Bay Buccaneers players
New Orleans Saints players
Hamilton Tiger-Cats players
Alabama Hammers players